Watwick Point Beacon is a leading light, which is a type of lighthouse, located near Dale, Pembrokeshire, in Wales. It is designed to lead ships into Milford Haven in conjunction with the West Blockhouse Point Beacons. It is situated about half a mile to the north-east of West Blockhouse Point.

Watwick Point Beacon comprises a circular pinkish-white tower. A large board at the top of the tower contains a vertical black and white daymark.

See also

 List of lighthouses in Wales

References

Lighthouses completed in 1957
Lighthouses in Pembrokeshire
Buildings and structures in Pembrokeshire
Daymarks